Gareth Cyril Williams (30 October 1941 – 4 June 2018) was a Welsh professional footballer

Later life and death
He died at his home on Gran Canaria on 4 June 2018 at the age of 76.

Honours
Cardiff City
 Welsh Cup: 1963–64, 1964–65, 1966–67

References

1941 births
2018 deaths
Welsh footballers
Cardiff City F.C. players
Bolton Wanderers F.C. players
Bury F.C. players
English Football League players
Footballers from Hendon
Association football midfielders